Sanātanī is a term used to describe Hindu duties that incorporate teachings from The Vedas, The Upanishads, and other Hindu religious texts and scriptures such as The Ramayana and The Bhagavad Gita, which itself is often described as a concise guide to Hindu philosophy and a practical, self-contained guide to life. The word sanatani is coined from Sanātana Dharma which refers to the idea that its origins lie beyond human history, as revealed in the Hindu texts.

A Sanatani performs duties according to one's spiritual (constitutional) identity as atman (Self) and thus these duties are the same for everyone. General duties include virtues such as honesty, refraining from injuring living beings, purity, goodwill, mercy, patience, forbearance, self-restraint, generosity, and asceticism.In other words, any follower of Sanātana Dharma (Hinduism) irrespective of their social status, Hindu denominations or choice of god/s, can be considered a Sanatani.

Sanatanis as a denomination
Since many reformist groups had the word Samaj (meaning society) or were led by a sant (meaning saint), Sanatanis are often held to be in contrast with Samajists and Santpanthis (meaning those who walk on the panth/path shown by their sant/saint). Unlike South India, where religious traditions such as Shaivism, Shaktism and Vaishnavism form the principal Hindu denominations, "they were effectively subsumed under the Sanatani identity" in many regions of North India, and the Samajs and Santpanths became the other distinct Hindu denominations.

Reformist denominations such as the Arya Samaj are often fundamentalist in their approach. The Arya Samaj regards the Vedas as infallible scripture, and rejects what it regards as non-Vedic innovations in Sanatani Hinduism. These non-Vedic additions included inherited caste, the position of Brahmins as a revered group, idol-worship, and the addition of thousands of deities to the Sanatani Hindu pantheon.

These differences are often apparent in social practices. Arya Samaji weddings, for instance, are based on Vedic practice and tend to be simpler and shorter with a qualified individual of any caste-heritage conducting the wedding, whereas Sanatani weddings are longer, with more complex rituals and always involve an officiating Brahmin priest.

Competition with other denominations
Sanatanis and reformists (such as the Arya Samaj, the Radha Soamis and the Ramakrishna Mission) have competed for adherents for more than a century, sometimes creating deep schisms in Hindu society, as in the case of South African Hindus who were split between the Arya Samaj and Sanatanis. While the reformist groups were better organized initially, by the 1860s, a process of internal counter-reform was underway in Sanatani groups as well, and societies to propagate orthodox beliefs along modern lines emerged, such as Sanatan Dharm Rakshini Sabha in 1873. Some religious commentators have compared the Sanatani-Samaji dichotomy within Hinduism as similar to the Catholic-Protestant division in Christianity.

References

Hindu denominations